"A Different Kind of Love" is a song written by Joacim Dubbelman, Martin Landh and Sam McCarthy, and performed by Caroline Wennergren at Melodifestivalen 2005. Participating in the fourth semifinal in Växjö, the song made it directly to the finals, where it ended up 5th.

Released as a single the same year. the song also appeared on her 2005 album Bossa Supernova.

Charts

References 

2005 singles
Caroline Wennergren songs
Melodifestivalen songs of 2005
2005 songs
Songs written by Sam McCarthy